The Emperor and the Kite, written by Jane Yolen and illustrated by Ed Young, is a 1967 picture book. The Emperor and the Kite was a Caldecott Medal Honor Book for 1968 and was Young's first Caldecott Honor Medal of a total of three during his career.

Description
The story, written by Yolen, is told in present tense from the third-person point of view (a third person narrative) and takes the form of a short story of 32 pages. A lot of this story is centralized upon the daughter and how everyone's opinion changes once the daughter does something amazing. The illustrations by Young, which also precede and follow the text, include a very detailed and traditional style of art that follows very closely to the actions that are being presented in the text.

Synopsis
In Imperial China, there is an emperor who has four sons and three daughters that meant the world to him. He, later on, has a fourth daughter named Djeow Seow. This emperor barely pays attention to the small and young Djeow Seow. One day these "bad" men come and take the emperor from his throne to an isolated and secluded tower and then lie to everyone that the emperor is dead. The "bad" men did not notice Djeow Seow watching all the events unfold from a corner. She preserves her father's life by sending him baskets of food via kite to the hidden tower. The daughter used to play with her kite every day because no one noticed or paid any attention to her. This being her chance, she thinks of the idea to use her kite string to rescue her father. The emperor then slides down along the string of the kite to safety and returns home to reclaim China from these people who kidnapped him. He rules happily with his youngest daughter now by his side, showering her with love and affection after the events that unfolded.

Critical reception
The Emperor and the Kite was published to great overall ratings from major reviewing websites.

See also
Children's literature

References

Caldecott Honor-winning works
1967 children's books
Children's books by Jane Yolen
American picture books
Works set in Imperial China
Children's books about China
Children's fiction books
Books about kite flying